The Azerbaijan Cup 2004–05 was the 13th season of the annual cup competition in Azerbaijan with the final taking place on 28 May 2005. Sixteen teams competed in this year's competition. Neftchi Baku were the defending champions.

First round
The first legs were played on October 20, 2004 and the second legs on October 27, 2004.

|}

Round of 16
The first legs were played on November 24, 2004 and the second legs on December 1, 2004.

|}

Quarterfinals
The first legs were played on March 7, 2005 and the second legs on March 15, 2005.

|}

Semifinals
The first legs were played on April 16, 2005 and the second legs on April 29, 2005.

|}

First leg

Second leg

Inter Baku won 3–2 on aggregate.

Baku won 2–1 on aggregate.

Final

References

External links
 Official page 
 rsssf

Azerbaijan Cup seasons
Azerbaijan Cup 2004-05
Azerbaijan Cup 2004-05